The Fort Lauderdale Stakes is a Grade II American Thoroughbred horse race open for three years old or older, over a distance of one and one-eighth miles on the turf track held annually in December at Gulfstream Park, Hallandale Beach, Florida.  The event currently carries a purse of $200,000.

History

The inaugural running of the event was on 5 April 1947 as the Fort Lauderdale Handicap and was won by the 2/5 odds-on favorite Eternal Reward who set a track record of 1:45 for the  miles distance on the dirt track. The event was brought forward for the second running during the 1947–48 meeting and was held on 27 December 1947.  In 1950 and 1951 the event was run as the Fort Lauderdale Purse.

By the 1950s the event had established itself as a feature handicap for older horses in South Florida. The 1954 running attracted enough entrants that it was split into two divisions. In 1956 the winner New Trend ridden by US Hall of Fame jockey Willie Shoemaker set a new track record for the  miles distance of 1:42 flat winning easily by  lengths.

The following year in 1957 the event attracted the U.S. Champion Three-Year-Old Colt Needles who had won both the 1956 Kentucky Derby and Belmont Stakes and was running his last race of his career. Needles produced one of the most amazing performance after racing 20 lengths behind the leaders during the race to produce a breathtaking performance in the straight to overhaul the leaders and win by two lengths and equal the track record that was set in 1956.

The 1960s were a stable period for the event as it continually was held in early April. During those years the event attracted many fine entrants including three foreign bred winners including Captain Kidd II who won the National Breeders' Produce Stakes in England as a two-year-old, Valentine won won the event by 7 lengths in 1963 ran second in the important Eclipse Stakes at Sandown Park in England to Henry The Seventh. The 1965 renewal of the event was as the Fort Lauderdale Purse and was held on the turf track for the first time was won by the Argentine-bred Babington who equaled the world record for the distance in a stunning 1:40.

During the 1970s the legal inflighting between owner Donn family's Gulfstream Park and John W. Galbreath's Hialeah Park over racing date allotments impacted the scheduling of the event. The event was only held five times during that period. During the early 1980s the event was held over a distance of seven furlongs. In 1988 the event was scheduled on the turf over  miles and run in split divisions for the second time.

The 1994 winner Paradise Creek won the event as a 3/5 odds-on favorite with a determined stretch drive winning by  length. The victory was Paradise Creek's third win in a seven race winning streak. Later in the year Paradise Creek was awarded US Champion Male Turf Horse honors.
 
In 1995 the American Graded Stakes Committee classified the event as Grade III.

The event was not held in 2001, 2003 and 2004 which led to the event losing it classification.

In 2005 the race was renewed as a Black Type event with stakes allowance conditions with the modified name Fort Lauderdale Stakes.

Assigned Grade III status beginning in 2010. Due to weather, however, the race was run off the turf in 2010. It was run a mile on dirt and was automatically downgraded, pending review, after the event was switched. The American Graded Stakes Committee reinstated the Grade III rating. The decision to reinstate the Grade 3 rating was based on the quality of the horses who competed in the race following the surface change.

In 2013 the event was upgraded once more to Grade II.

In 2019 the distance of the event was increased from  miles to  miles.

Records
Speed record 
 miles turf: 1:45.60   – Doswell (2021)
 miles turf: 1:38.26  – Union Place  (2005)
 miles dirt: 1:41.00  – Rouge Chanteur (1971)

Margins 
 8 lengths – Belleau Chief  (1959)

Most wins by a jockey
 8 – Jerry D. Bailey (1978, 1985, 1995, 1996, 1997, 1999, 2000, 2002)

Most wins by a trainer
 8 – William I. Mott (1988, 1994, 1996, 1997, 1999, 2000, 2002, 2007)

Most wins by an owner 
 2 – Allen E. Paulson (1999, 2002)
 2 – Kenneth L. and Sarah K. Ramsey  (2000, 2018)

Winners 

Legend:

 
 

Notes:

§ Ran as an entry

ƒ Filly or Mare

† In 2018 the event was held twice in the calendar year. For the 2017–18 meeting the event was held in January and in the 2018–19 meeting the event was held in December
 
‡ In 1947 the event was held twice in the calendar year. The inaugural running was held in April and for the 1947–48 season the event was scheduled in December

See also
List of American and Canadian Graded races

References 

Horse races in Florida
Graded stakes races in the United States
Gulfstream Park
1947 establishments in Florida
Recurring sporting events established in 1947
Grade 2 stakes races in the United States
Turf races in the United States